Aberdeen Gardens is a census-designated place (CDP) in Grays Harbor County, Washington, United States. The population was 279 at the 2010 census.

Geography
Aberdeen Gardens is located at  (47.072449, -123.770557), about 8 miles north of the city of Aberdeen.

According to the United States Census Bureau, the CDP has a total area of 1.62 square miles (4.19 km2), all of it land.

Demographics

At the 2010 census, there were 279 people, 114 households and 80 families residing in the CDP. The population density was 171.8 per square mile (66.6/km2). There were 122 housing units at an average density of 75.3/sq mi (29.1/km2). The racial makeup was 91.0% White, 1.8% Native American, 2.2% from other races, and 5.0% from two or more races. Hispanic or Latino of any race were 5.0% of the population.

There were 114 households, of which 32.5% had children under the age of 18 living with them, 55.3% were married couples living together, 10.5% had a female householder with no husband present, and 29.8% were non-families. 27.2% of all households were made up of individuals, and 8.8% had someone living alone who was 65 years of age or older. The average household size was 2.45 and the average family size was 2.98.

21.1% of the population were under the age of 18, 8.2% from 18 to 24, 20.4% from 25 to 44, 38.0% from 45 to 64, and 12.2% who were 65 years of age or older. The median age was 45.1 years. For every 100 females, there were 99.3 males. For every 100 females age 18 and over, there were 103.7 males.

At the time of the 2000 census, the median household income was $38,403 and the median family income was $38,819. Males had a median income of $38,333 and females $16,364. The per capita income was $17,341. About 10.1% of families and 7.5% of the population were below the poverty line, including none of those under the age of eighteen and 4.3% of those 65 or over.

References

Census-designated places in Grays Harbor County, Washington
Census-designated places in Washington (state)